Sweden was represented by Lena Philipsson and the song "It Hurts", which won the song selection Melodifestivalen 2004 under the title "Det gör ont".

Before Eurovision

Melodifestivalen 2004 

Melodifestivalen 2004 was hosted by Charlotte Perrelli (winner of the Eurovision Song Contest 1999), Ola Lindholm and Peter Settman. 32 songs were divided into 4 heats in order to find 10 finalists for the final. As usual, 2 songs from each heat directly qualified for the final, and all 3rd and 4th places went to the Wildcard round, where 2 more songs would make it to the final. The winner was chosen by regional juries (50%) and televoting (50%) of which Lena Philipsson was the favourite with both. The song is written and composed by Thomas 'Orup' Eriksson.

Heats and Second Chance round 

 The first heat took place on 21 February 2004. "Tango! Tango!" performed by Petra Nielsen and "Som stormen" performed by Sara Löfgren qualified directly to the final, while "Love Turns Water Into Wine" performed by Karl Martindahl and "Älvorna" performed by Sarek advanced to the Second Chance round. "En gång för alla" performed by Nina and Kim, "Still Believe" performed by Joachim Bergström, "It's in the Stars" performed by LaGaylia Frazier and "Tro på mig" performed by Niklas Andersson were eliminated from the contest.
 The second heat took place on 28 February 2004. "Paradise" performed by E-Type feat. Nana and "Vindarna vänder oss" performed by Fame qualified directly to the final, while "Finally" performed by Fredrik Kempe and "Säg att du har ångrat dig" performed by Anne-Lie Rydé advanced to the Second Chance round. "Soy tu Venus" performed by Baccara, "You Are the Sunshine of My Life" performed by Jennifer Escola, "Trendy Discoteque" performed by Pay TV and "(Are U) Ready or Not" performed by LaRoxx were eliminated from the contest.
 The third heat took place on 6 March 2004. "Här stannar jag kvar" performed by Sandra Dahlberg and "C'est la vie" performed by Hanson, Carson and Malmkvist qualified directly to the final, while "Efharisto" performed by Bosson and "Blow the Spot" performed by Bubbles advanced to the Second Chance round. "Innan mörkret faller" performed by Emil Sigfridsson, "Baby I Can't Stop" performed by Gladys del Pilar, "Super Mega Nova" performed by Itchycoo and "Bulletproof Heart" performed by Autolove were eliminated from the contest.
 The fourth heat took place on 13 March 2004. "Det gör ont" performed by Lena Philipsson and "La dolce vita" performed by After Dark qualified directly to the final, while "Olé Olé" performed by Andrés Esteche and "Min kärlek" performed by Shirley Clamp advanced to the Second Chance round. "Just Like Me" performed by Anders Borgius, "Boom Bang-a-Bang" performed by Glenn Borgkvist and Lotta Nilsson, "Runaway" performed by Pandora and "Äntligen" performed by Fre were eliminated from the contest.
 The Second Chance round (Andra chansen) took place on 14 March 2004. "Olé Olé" performed by Andrés Esteche and "Min kärlek" performed by Shirley Clamp qualified to the final.

Final 
The final took place on 20 March 2004 at the Globe Arena in Stockholm.

At Eurovision
For the Eurovision Song Contest 2004, a semi-final round was introduced in order to accommodate the influx of nations that wanted to compete in the contest. Since Sweden placed 5th in the previous contest year, Sweden automatically qualified to compete in the final along with the Big Four countries and nine other nations that were also successful in the 2003 Contest.

Lena sang "Det gör ont" in its English version, "It Hurts". Lena appeared on stage with her backing singers lined up on the side. She moved on stage by herself very effectively and gave one of the best performances of the night. Lena's performance and attire was very similar to her Melodifestivalen performance. Sweden closed the contest performing last in the 24th spot and eventually making their way up to a joint 5th place with 170 points, receiving 4 sets of 12-points, meaning that Sweden automatically qualified for the final in the 2005 contest.

Voting

Points awarded to Sweden

Points awarded by Sweden

References

2004
Countries in the Eurovision Song Contest 2004
Eurovision
Eurovision